Gorenje Polje is a small settlement in the Municipality of Kanal ob Soči in western Slovenia. From 1952 to 2008, the village was part of the settlement of Anhovo. The settlement is part of the traditional region of the Slovenian Littoral and is included in the Gorizia Statistical Region.

The parish church in the settlement is dedicated to Saint Michael. It belongs to the Diocese of Koper.

References

External links
Gorenje Polje on Geopedia

Populated places in the Municipality of Kanal
Populated places established in 2008
2008 establishments in Slovenia